The Shit is an unreleased studio album by hip hop duo 2nd II None, originally set for release in 1994 on Death Row Records but was shelved and later leaked in 2008. The album is executive produced by Suge Knight and produced by DJ Quik.

Track listing 
"Intro" - 0:35
"Get'cha Clown On" - 4:23
"Why Must I..." - 4:19
"Nasty Message" - (featuring Lashelle) 0:23
"I Can Tell (The Nasty Song)" (featuring Jewell) - 4:11
"Nuthin' Has Changed" (featuring DJ Quik) - 4:04
"Let's Get Higher" (featuring DJ Quik) - 5:52
"Kan't Wait To Do This" (featuring 2 Tone(rip)) - 3:49
"Tha Shit" - 5:59
"Gotta Get'cha Hot" - (featuring Goldy Mac) 4:29
"Funny How Things Change" - (featuring Father Amde Hamilton of Watts Prophets) 4:08
"B Alright" - (featuring Dionne Knighton) 4:01
"If U Ain't Fuckin' (How You Gonna Get Home?)" (featuring Sexy Leroy & The Chocolate Lovelitez) - 4:44
"Didn't Mean To Turn You On" - 4:44
"Funny How Things Change (Remix)" - 4:12
"Theo Commercial" (featuring DJ Quik) - 2:13

References 

2nd II None albums
Albums produced by DJ Quik
Death Row Records albums
Interscope Records albums
Unreleased albums
G-funk albums